The DuPont Show with June Allyson (also known as The June Allyson Show) is an American anthology drama series which aired on CBS from September 21, 1959, to April 3, 1961, with rebroadcasts continuing until June 12, 1961. 

The series was hosted by actress June Allyson and was a Four Star-Pamric Production. Allyson sometimes starred in episodes, one of which ("A Summer's Ending") was her first appearance on TV with her husband, Dick Powell.

Aaron Spelling was the producer. Paul Henreid, James Neilson, and Jack Smight were directors. Richard Levinson and William Link were writers for the program. 

Allyson took offense when critics dismissed the program with comments that included comparing its episodes to contents of women's fiction magazines. "Any show that stars a woman just naturally seems to be called a soap opera, whether it is or not", she said.

Episode guide

Season 1

Season 2

References

External links

  
at CVTA with episode list

1950s American anthology television series
1960s American anthology television series
1959 American television series debuts
1961 American television series endings
Black-and-white American television shows
CBS original programming
1950s American drama television series
1960s American drama television series
Television series by Four Star Television
Television series by 20th Century Fox Television
DuPont